Tomasz Dymanowski (born December 12, 1973 in Sandomierz) is a former Polish professional football player.

External links
 
 

1973 births
Living people
Polish footballers
Stal Stalowa Wola players
KSZO Ostrowiec Świętokrzyski players
People from Sandomierz
Sportspeople from Świętokrzyskie Voivodeship
Association football goalkeepers
Stal Rzeszów players
Sokół Pniewy players